Gregory James Russ (born 12 April 1971) is a former New Zealand field hockey player, who finished in eighth position with the men's national team, known as the Black Sticks, at the 1992 Summer Olympics in Barcelona. He was born in Auckland and is the brother of Craig Russ, also an Olympic hockey player for New Zealand.

References
 New Zealand Olympic Committee

External links
 

New Zealand male field hockey players
Field hockey players at the 1992 Summer Olympics
Olympic field hockey players of New Zealand
Field hockey players from Auckland
1971 births
Living people
Greg